"Stop Loving You" is a song from the rock band Toto from their album The Seventh One. It features Jon Anderson on backing vocals. It was released as the first single from the album in Europe, peaking at No. 2 in The Netherlands and Belgium.

Music video

A music video was produced for this song showing Joseph Williams kicking furniture and pushing away other objects in a building, displaying his disgust at the loss of a girlfriend. The band together performs in other parts of the video. At the end of the video, a woman calls and asks, "Joseph, are you there?"

Personnel
Toto
 Joseph Williams – lead and backing vocals
 Steve Lukather – lead and rhythm guitars, backing vocals
 David Paich – keyboards, synthesizers, backing vocals
 Mike Porcaro – bass guitar
 Jeff Porcaro – drums, percussion

Additional musicians
 Jon Anderson – backing vocals
 Michael G. Fisher – percussion
 Bill Payne – synthesizers
 Tom Scott – horn arrangements
 Chuck Findley, Gary Grant, Gary Herbig, Jerry Hey, James Pankow and Tom Scott – horns

Charts

Year-End Chart

Live versions
With original lead vocalist Joseph Williams having left the group not long after the song's recording, lead vocal duties on the song were passed on to Tony Spinner in 2002. Before that many touring members had sung the song on Toto's live concerts.
 For their live album, Falling in Between Live and final concerts, Toto performed a semi jazz version of the song.

Since Williams' return in 2010, "Stop Loving You" has since appeared on 35th Anniversary Tour and 40 Trips Around the Sun, two live albums released in 2014 and 2018 respectively.

References

Toto (band) songs
1988 singles
Songs written by David Paich
1988 songs
Columbia Records singles
Songs written by Steve Lukather